AKM Fazlul Haque Milon is a Bangladesh Nationalist Party politician and the former Member of Parliament of Gazipur-3.

Career
Milon is a former President of Jatiyatabadi Chhatra Dal.

Milon contested the June 1996 Bangladeshi general election from Gazipur-3 as a Bangladesh Nationalist Party candidate and lost. He had received 30,834 votes while the winner, Akhtaruzzaman of Awami League received 35,502 votes.

Milon was elected to parliament from Gazipur-3 as a Bangladesh Nationalist Party candidate in 2001. He had received 58,518 votes while his nearest rival, Akhtaruzzaman of Awami League, had received 58,133 votes. He was the only candidate from Bangladesh Nationalist Party to be elected from Gazipur District in the 8 parliamentary election. He was the General Secretary of Swechchhasebak Dal and Gazipur District unit of Bangladesh Nationalist Party. He received a plot in Dhaka from the government along 104 members of parliament from the Bangladesh Nationalist Party and Bangladesh Jamaat-e-Islami.

In September 2007, Milon was arrested from Gulshan by Rapid Action Battalion. Rapid Action Battalion additional director general Gulzar Uddin Ahmed reported that Milon was held under Emergency Power Rules and was handed over to Ramna Police station. He was charged with embezzling metal sheets meant for relief. His Mitsubishi Pajero was also seized by Rapid Action Battalion. He was sentenced to prison by Dhaka metropolitan magistrate ABM Abdul Fattah. The Anti Corruption Commission placed him on a list of 80 suspected corrupt politicians.

Milon was nominated to contest the 2008 Bangladeshi general election from Gazipur-5 as a Bangladesh Nationalist Party candidate. He lost the election with 74,899 votes while the winner, Meher Afroz of Awami League, received 125,903 votes.

In March 2009, Milon received bail in a cases filed by the Anti Corruption Commission.

Milon campaigned for the Bangladesh Nationalist Party candidate for the 2011 Brahmanbaria-3 by election, Khaled Hossain Mahbub Shamol, against RAM Ubaidul Muktadir Chowdhury of Awami League.

In May 2012, Milon and 32 other senior leaders of Bangladesh Nationalist Party were sent to jail in an arson case, regarding over a dozen vehicles burned during a strike by his party, after their bail petition was denied.

Milon did not participate the 2014 Bangladeshi general election as the Bangladesh Nationalist Party boycotted it. Meher Afroz of Awami League was elected uncontested from Gazipur-5. In December 2014, Bangladesh Chhattra League took over a venue of Bangladesh Nationalist Party at Bhawal Badre Alam College in Gazipur where former prime minister Khaleda Zia was scheduled to speak. Milon vowed to hold the rally at the college despite it.

In 2018, Milon was nominated by Bangladesh Nationalist Party to contest the 2018 Bangladeshi general election from Gazipur-5. He was arrested in December 2018 from Gazipur, before the election, following arrest warrants issued from Dhaka. He was one of a number of Bangladesh Nationalist Party leaders held in jail before the election. He lost the election to Meher Afroz of Awami League. He had received 27,976 votes while Afroz had received 207,699 votes.

Milon was arrested on 11 October 2022 after he and fellow Bangladesh Nationalist Party leader blocked a road according to Bangadesh Police while the party claimed they were holding a peaceful rally.

References

Living people
People from Gazipur District
Bangladesh Nationalist Party politicians
6th Jatiya Sangsad members
8th Jatiya Sangsad members
Place of birth missing (living people)
Year of birth missing (living people)